Abdulahat Nur (born on 10 June 1967 in Xinjiang) is Canadian Uyghur politician and East Turkistan independence leader. He is currently the Vice-President of the East Turkistan Government-in-Exile.

References

Canadian people of Uyghur descent
East Turkestan independence activists
Uyghur politicians
1967 births
Living people